Decembrist, Dekabrist, or The Decembrists may refer to:
 Decembrist revolt or Dekabrist revolt, failed Russian uprising in December 1825
 Decembrist revolution (Argentina), coup by Juan Lavalle in December 1828
 "The Decembrist" (The Blacklist), episode 8 of season 2 of The Blacklist, aired in 2014
 The Decembrists, Leo Tolstoy's unfinished sequel to War and Peace
 The Decembrists (film), 1927 Soviet silent historical drama directed by Aleksandr Ivanovsky
 The Decembrists (opera), 1953 opera by Yuri Shaporin
 The Decemberists, American indie rock band

See also
 Decembrists Square, former name for Senate Square, Saint Petersburg, Russia
 Decembrists' Island or Dekabristov Island, Saint Petersburg, Russia
 Dekabrist (disambiguation)